Francisco Costanzo Milano (born November 4, 1912, date of death unknown) was an Uruguayan boxer who competed in the 1936 Summer Olympics. In 1936 he was eliminated in the first round of the welterweight class after losing his fight to Roger Tritz.

External links

1912 births
Year of death missing
Welterweight boxers
Olympic boxers of Uruguay
Boxers at the 1936 Summer Olympics
Uruguayan people of Italian descent
Uruguayan male boxers